Sinope may refer to:
Sinop, Turkey, a city on the Black Sea, historically known as Sinope
 Battle of Sinop, 1853 naval battle in the Sinop port
Sinop Province
Sinope, Leicestershire, a hamlet in the Midlands of England
Sinope (mythology), in Greek mythology, daughter of Asopus
Sinope (moon), a moon of the planet Jupiter
Sinope (moth), a moth genus
Sinope Gospels, fragment of a 6th-century illuminated manuscript

History 
 Siege of Sinope, a battle during the late history of the Byzantine Empire
 Empire of Trebizond, the territory for which the above siege was fought

See also
 Sinop (disambiguation)